Nadia Sawalha (born 18 November 1964) is a British actress, television personality and YouTuber. She played the role of Gina in ITV comedy Second Thoughts from 1992 to 1994, and Annie Palmer on the BBC One soap opera EastEnders from 1997 to 1999. She has been a long-term panelist on the ITV daytime talk show Loose Women, being one of the original panelists from its start in 1999 until 2002, before returning to the show in 2013 after a panelist revamp. She has also had roles in The Bill, Casualty, Benidorm and 99-1 and presented numerous television programmes. 

After winning the 2007 series of Celebrity MasterChef, Sawalha has continued to make appearances on cookery shows as a presenter and as a chef.

Career
After training at the Italia Conti Academy of Theatre Arts, Sawalha began her career in theatre. From 1997 to 1999, she starred in EastEnders as businesswoman Annie Palmer. Her other acting television credits include Casualty, Which Way to the War and ITV police drama, The Bill. Sawalha has also appeared in the films Clockwise (1986), Which Way to the War (1994), Slave of Dreams (1995), The Vanishing Man (1996) and the BBC Victorian drama Station Jim (2001), Caught in the Act (1997).

From 1999 to 2002, Sawalha was a regular panellist on the lunchtime chat show Loose Women. She returned in October 2013.

In 2001, Sawalha presented the short-lived ITV quiz programme It's Not the Answer with Peter Dickinson as the announcer.

For the BBC, Sawalha has fronted four series of Passport to the Sun, the Total series, TV Mail, Heir Hunters, Perfect Partner and Family Exchange. She is also a co-host on the live documentary City Hospital. Sawalha has previously hosted the BBC One show Living in the Sun, about British expats living in Spain, made by Ricochet, and Wanted Down Under, which shows families who want to make the move Down Under (Australia, occasionally New Zealand) and what it would be like to live and work in those Antipodean nations. She can also be seen on Accidents Can Happen, a daytime BBC One programme produced by Twofour, which follows families as they try to rebuild their homes and their lives following disaster.

In 2005, Sawalha presented the BBC One programme Mirror, Signal, Manoeuvre which followed learner drivers as they learnt to drive and took their driving tests with varying degrees of success. Sawalha was one of the learner drivers who ended up passing her driving test at the end of the second series. In the same year and on the same network, Sawalha also co-presented with Jeremy Milnes for the programme Keeping Up with the Joneses.

In the summer of 2006, Sawalha began co-presenting The One Show with Adrian Chiles. However, due to her pregnancy, she did not return to the show in the summer of 2007 and was replaced by Christine Bleakley.

After winning Celebrity MasterChef, Sawalha went on to co-present the children's version of the show Junior Masterchef, she was said to be 'delighted' to be given the chance to host the show.

In 2008, Sawalha returned to BBC One, to present the daytime programme, Wanted Down Under. She presented the 2009 programme Eating in the Sun, produced by her husband Mark Adderley and has Sawalha challenged by celebrity chefs to cook in their favourite holiday restaurants.

From 15 February until 20 August 2010, Sawalha presented the reality programme Instant Restaurant for BBC Two.

In December 2010, Sawalha presented in a fitness DVD entitled Nadia Sawalha: Fat To Fab, after losing three and a half stone.

In July 2011, Sawalha guest presented ITV Breakfast programme Lorraine and has since made regular appearances on the show, not only as a stand-in presenter but also as a resident chef.

In January 2011, Sawalha starred in the sixth series of ITV's Dancing on Ice with Scottish professional Mark Hanretty, but was voted out in a double elimination in the first week along with Angela Rippon and her partner Sean Rice.

In April 2012, she began co-presenting Saturday Cookbook on ITV Breakfast with chef Mark Sargeant.

In 2012, Sawalha presented the UKTV Home series Kitchen SOS.

From 27 October to 29 December 2013, Sawalha and Kaye Adams co-hosted one series of Sunday Scoop, a cookery show.

From 7 January 2015, Sawalha took part in the fifteenth series of Celebrity Big Brother on Channel 5. She lasted 24 days in the house before being evicted.

Sawalha presented her own cookery show, Nadia's Family Feasts, on ITV. She took inspiration from busy households around the world as she searched for new ideas for recipes that would fit into hectic schedules. Each week, she was joined by a guest chef with a passion or expertise in that cuisine.

Sawalha now hosts a few podcasts with her husband, Mark Adderley. In "How to Stay Married (So Far)" Nadia and Mark talk about the ups and downs of married life. In "Confessions of a Modern Parent", they discuss the modern issues that face teenagers, with an insight from Sawalha's daughter Maddie, and Carlitos, Lisa Mejuto's son.

Books
Stuffed Vine Leaves Saved My Life (2010)
Greedy Girl's Diet (2013)
Greedy Girl's Diet: Second Helpings! (2013)
Fabulous Family Food (2014)
Nadia Sawalha's Little Black Dress Diet (2016)
Nadia and Kaye: Disaster Chef (2018) – with Kaye Adams

YouTube

Sawalha started a YouTube channel with fellow Loose Women panellist Kaye Adams. They had their own YouTube account, Instagram account and Facebook page where they did weekly vlogs, cooking videos, film and TV programme reviews. They also focused on daily normal family routines as well. This account, however, is now inactive.

Sawalha launched a Sawalha-Adderley YouTube channel. The Sawalha-Adderleys (Originally Nadia Sawalha and Family) on Monday 25 August 2014, featuring Sawalha with her husband Mark Adderley. Also regularly appearing are their two children, Sawalha's parents, Adderley's mother Nanni Di, Sawalha 's sister Dina and Sawalha 's best friend and make-up artist, Lisa and her two children.

The channel began as a film and TV show review where Sawalha, Adderley and sometimes their children would review films coming out in the cinema, or a popular TV show on television.  But by the end of 2014, her family decided to make varied content with the first being Vlogmas where the family do a vlog every day in December. This proved to be a hit with their followers. From 2015 onwards the channel has been releasing at least two videos daily.

In December 2016 the channel launched a subscription to the channel. It had a monthly cost of £1.99 and included their weekly The No-Named Sunday show which features different segments from memes, cooking, newspapers, book reviews, 'Teddy Talks', 'Lisa Loves...' and a weekly livestream for members only.

In February 2019 the channel reached 50,000 subscribers.  On 4 May 2020 the channel reached 100k and received a "silver play button".

Personal life
Sawalha was raised and still lives in Croydon, South London. She is the daughter of the Jordanian-born British actor Nadim Sawalha and his English wife Roberta Lane. She is the sister of television actress Julia Sawalha and has appeared on Lily Savage's Blankety Blank with her. In 1997, the three starred together in Dearest Daddy... Darling Daughter at the Young Vic Theatre in South London.

Sawalha has suffered from psoriasis and has used homeopathy rather than conventional treatment. In 2019, Sawalha revealed on Loose Women she suffers from tinnitus.

On 25 December 1997, Sawalha's first husband Justin Mildwater ended his life by suicide. They had been married for five years, but had split up a few months before.

On 6 June 2002, she married her second husband, television producer Mark Adderley.

Sawalha is an atheist.

On 31 May 2017, Sawalha spoke in an emotional video online about losing her hair at the age of 52. Sawalha said that her curls were fake and she was going through the perimenopause, the start of the menopause. She said that a doctor told her in September 2016 she had the balding gene.

On 25 November 2022, Sawalha announced that she had been diagnosed with ADHD at the age of 58.

Filmography

Video Games

Theatre Credits

See also
 List of Celebrity Big Brother (British TV series) housemates
 List of Dancing on Ice contestants

References

External links

Nadia Sawalha @ ukgameshows.com

1964 births
Living people
20th-century English actresses
21st-century English actresses
English people of Jordanian descent
ITV Breakfast presenters and reporters
English film actresses
English soap opera actresses
English television actresses
English television presenters
English atheists
Alumni of the Italia Conti Academy of Theatre Arts
People from Wandsworth
British women television journalists
Reality cooking competition winners